Robert Marvin Epstein (born March 10, 1928) is an American anesthesiologist, a member of the National Academy of Medicine, and the Harold Carron Professor of Anesthesiology (emeritus) at the University of Virginia.

Early life and education 
Epstein was born in the Bronx, New York on March 10, 1928, the son of immigrants from Slonim, in present-day Belarus.  He attended primary school in the Bronx, and completed his secondary education in Miami Beach, Florida where the family moved in 1940.  From there he attended the University of Michigan from 1944 to 1951, where he obtained both his bachelor's and MD degrees.  Epstein served as an attending anesthesiologist with a rank of 1st Lieutenant in the US Army Medical Corps, and was stationed first in Korea and later in Japan.

Columbia University 
Epstein underwent residency training at Columbia University in the department chaired by Emanuel Papper, and subsequently joined the Columbia faculty.

He developed an early interest in the causes and prevention of avoidable death due to anesthesia, and was an advocate for the mandatory implementation of specific improvements in anesthesia machines and for the analysis of adverse critical incidents.  The technical improvements were designed to prevent the inadvertent administration of oxygen-deficient mixtures of anesthetic gases.  Although the hazards of such mixtures had been appreciated since the 1940s, the work published by Epstein and coauthors in 1962 represents the first oxygen "fail safe" apparatus proposed for inhalation anesthesia.  The first oxygen "fail safe" device to be custom built and employed in clinical practice following these principles is on display at the Wood Library-Museum. He was the first to predict and establish mutual effects of multiple gas interactions on rates of anesthetic uptake, the "second gas effect."

University of Virginia 
Epstein became the chairman of the Department of Anesthesiology at the University of Virginia in 1972, and led the department for 24 years.  In honor of his service to the department, an endowed chair was created, the Robert M. Epstein Professorship in Anesthesiology.  During his tenure as chairman at UVa, he was instrumental to the establishment (and served as president) of the University of Virginia Health Services Foundation, an organization devoted to strengthening the medical faculty

Honors, awards, and service to the profession 
Member, IOM / National Academy of Medicine, elected 1989

Fellow of the Royal College of Anaesthetists (England), elected 1981

Director, American Board of Anesthesiology (1972 - 1984)

President, American Board of Anesthesiology (1982 - 1983)

Board Member, Educational Commission for Foreign Medical Graduates (1991 - 1996)

Member, Editorial Board, Anesthesiology (5 year term)

Past President, Association of University Anesthesiologists

Selected publications

References

1928 births
Living people
People from Miami Beach, Florida
University of Michigan Medical School alumni
American people of Belarusian-Jewish descent
Columbia University faculty
University of Virginia faculty
Fellows of the Royal College of Anaesthetists
Members of the National Academy of Medicine
American anesthesiologists
Scientists from the Bronx